Ambra A. Pozzi is an Italian American physician who is a professor of nephrology in the Vanderbilt University Medical Center. She works on matrix biology and matrix receptor biology. In 2022, she was appointed President Elect of the American Society for Matrix Biology.

Early life and education 
Pozzi was born in Brescia. She earned her master's degree at the University of Milan, where she majored in biochemistry. She moved to the University of Florence for her doctoral research. Her research focused on experimental pathology. Her mentor encouraged her to study abroad, and she eventually moved to the United States. She moved to Scripps Research for postdoctoral research.

Research and career 
In 2000, Pozzi joined Vanderbilt University where she focuses on matrix biology. She has two main research focuses: kidney fibrosis and endothelial cell functions. Fibrosis is the excessive deposition of extracellular matrix components (i.e. collagen) along critical nephrons (renal tubules). Fibrosis is an irreversible process, and people who get it require a kidney transplant. Pozzi showed that the cell surface receptor DDR1 is involved with the inflammation and fibrosis that can cause kidney failure.

Pozzi is on the editorial board of Matrix Biology, and has held various leadership positions within the American Society for Matrix Biology. In 2022, she became President Elect of the society.

Selected publications

References 

Living people
People from Brescia
University of Milan alumni
University of Florence alumni
Vanderbilt University faculty
Year of birth missing (living people)